The MT type carriages were railmotor trailers, used on the Victorian Railways (VR) in Australia.

Construction
When the VR built their AEC railmotors, it was realised that extra capacity was needed. To this end, they built the RailMotor Trailers, or MT class, specifically designed for the AEC railcars. When later railmotors were introduced, the same rollingstock code was used, resulting in the MT class being one which included several different designs. It was not uncommon for a train to be composed of one railmotor and two, three, or in rare cases, four trailers.

Types

AEC trailers
These were numbered 1 to 24, painted red to match the four-wheeled AEC railmotors, and were the only MT cars that were four-wheelers. They were built between 1922 and 1925, to a few slightly different designs.

PERM trailers
25 MT was converted from locomotive-hauled wooden bogie passenger carriage 20 APL in 1928, for use with the first PERM.

Numbers 26 to 30 were built in April, September, and October 1930 (when more PERMS entered service) and were painted red initially, although a different shade of red to the AEC trailers. They were of steel bodied construction, and similar design to the PERMS. When the PERMs were converted to DERM (diesel) railmotors in the mid-1950s, these five trailers were also painted in blue and gold to match.

More details: DERM → Trailers

(3rd) 8, 11, 12, 14, and 16 ABC were converted from locomotive-hauled wooden bogie passenger carriages, between April and July 1930, specifically for use with the ten PERM railmotors. These were originally built in 1890 & 1891 as non-corridor, five-compartment first-class carriages with guard's compartment (ADAD, later AC class), and had been extended between 1909 and 1912 by the addition of two more passenger compartments. They were intended to become  Dogbox 'M' cars. When that conversion scheme was halted, they returned to the locomotive-hauled fleet (with varying degrees of conversion evident), and were later converted to second-class (BC) carriages shortly before becoming railmotor trailers. All were scrapped between 1939 and 1961.

Walker trailers
Trailer cars 50 - 64 were Walkers railcar trailers placed in service between 1948 and 1954. Of note, is that Walker trailers 50 and 51 were originally classed RMT instead of MT. They were re-classed MT by 1949.More details: Walker railmotor → Trailers

Brill trailer
This was numbered 200. It remained in service until 1984. 200MT is now preserved at Daylesford Spa Country Railway

More details: Brill railmotor → 200MT

Other trailers
Trailer car 31 was converted from 65ABW in 1981, along with cars 32 to 34 that were converted from similar VFW cars 3, 4 and 6 (built as AW cars).

Cars 31 to 34 were painted in VR blue and gold, but only saw service as railmotor trailers for about 2–3 years.

Numbers 40 to 42 were trailers used behind road motor cars converted for rail use.

Numbers 35 to 39, 43 to 49, and 65 to 100 were not used.

MTH passenger cars
Four MTH cars were originally Harris suburban trains, but when these were taken out of electric service, a large number were refurbished for use on intrastate trains. As part of this, four were converted to MTH cars, for use behind the four DRC railcars. When the DRCs were taken out of service, the four MTH's were transferred to the Stony Point line, where they were run behind an A class diesel locomotive. Their last revenue-run was on Saturday, 26 April 2008. Now, no-one is sure of their fate, although they are currently in storage.
Three MTH carriages used to run on the Leongatha line with a P Class loco.

MTH 101 was converted from Harris car 517BT, 102 from 679T, 103 from 524BT, and 104 from 672T.

MTH 102 was later converted to Infrastructure Evaluation Vehicle IEV102 in 2011.

1300TM (VLocity centre cars)

VLocity centre cars are sometimes mistakenly considered trailer cars. Unlike railmotor trailers, these are classed TM, numbered in the 1300 range, and were built in order to extend existing 2-car VLocity railmotor sets into 3-car sets. The only major difference between a Vlocity and a Vlocity centre car, is that the former has cabs - they are NOT trailers because they are equipped with motors for traction. However the centre cars of the Standard Gauge Vlocitys are unpowered due to the buffet, and could be considered trailers.

Demise
Naturally, the trailer cars fell into disuse at the same time as their railmotor counterparts. A number have moved to heritage operators, in particular the Daylesford Spa Country Railway, which specialises in railmotors, and therefore also the trailers.

References
 Peter J. Vincent: ABC Bogie First/Second/Van Passenger car
 Peter J. Vincent: MT Railmotor Trailers
 Peter J. Vincent: MTH - Railmotor Trailer ex 'Harris' car
 Peter J. Vincent: RMT Railmotor Trailers
 Peter J. Vincent: BCPL - Bogie 1st/2nd/Guards Van

Victorian Railways carriages